In Swiss historiography, Alte Landschaft may refer to:
The territory surrounding the city of St. Gallen owned by the Imperial Abbey of St. Gall before 1798, also known as Fürstenland
The territory owned by the city of Fribourg before 1798; see history of Fribourg